Legends of the Fall is a 1994 American epic Western drama film directed by Edward Zwick and starring Brad Pitt, Anthony Hopkins, Aidan Quinn, Julia Ormond and Henry Thomas. Based on the 1979 novella of the same title by Jim Harrison, the film is about three brothers and their father living in the wilderness and plains of Montana in the early 20th century and how their lives are affected by nature, history, war, and love. The film's time frame spans from the early 20th century; World War I, through the Prohibition era, and ending with a brief scene set in 1963. The film was nominated for three Academy Awards and won for Best Cinematography (John Toll). Both the film and book contain occasional Cornish language terms, the Ludlows being a Cornish immigrant family.

Plot
Sick of betrayals the United States government perpetrated on Native Americans, Colonel William Ludlow leaves the Army, moving to a remote part of Montana. Along with One Stab, a Cree friend, he builds a ranch and raises his family. Accompanying them are hired hand and former outlaw Decker, Decker's Cree wife Pet, and daughter Isabel Two. William has three sons: Alfred, the eldest; Tristan, the  middle son; and Samuel, the youngest.

William's wife Isabel does not adapt to the harsh Montana winters and moves to the East Coast; Tristan vows never to speak of her. At age 12, Tristan touches a sleeping grizzly bear. The bear awakens and injures him, but he cuts off a claw.

Years later, Samuel returns from Harvard University with his fiancée, Susannah. Susannah finds Tristan captivating but loves Samuel. Before they can marry, Samuel announces his intention to join the Canadian Expeditionary Force and aid Britain in the fight against Germany. Much to their father's displeasure, Alfred also joins. Although Tristan does not want to join, he does so after swearing to Susannah to protect Samuel.

The brothers find themselves in the 10th Battalion, CEF. Alfred, commissioned as an officer, leads a charge into no man's land. The attack results in heavy casualties and Alfred is wounded. While visiting Alfred in the field hospital, Tristan learns that Samuel volunteered for a dangerous reconnaissance mission. He rushes off to protect his brother but arrives too late. Tristan holds Samuel until he dies, then cuts out his brother's heart and sends it home to be buried at the ranch. Tristan single-handedly raids the German lines and returns to camp with the scalps of German soldiers hanging around his neck, horrifying his fellow soldiers. He is discharged but does not go home. Alfred returns to Montana and proposes to Susannah, but she declines.

Tristan returns home, where Susannah finds him weeping over Samuel's grave. She comforts him and they become lovers. A jealous Alfred confronts Tristan before leaving to make his name in Helena. Tristan is plagued with guilt over Samuel's death and feels responsible for driving Alfred away; he leaves Montana for several years. Susannah vows to wait for Tristan, but eventually receives a letter from him telling her to marry someone else. Alfred comforts Susannah, and William finds them together, which leads to a falling out between him and Alfred. William later suffers a stroke. He does not speak for years and the ranch deteriorates. Susannah marries Alfred, now a congressman. Alfred's business and politics cause him to get involved with the O'Banion brothers, Irish bootleggers and gangsters.

Tristan returns during Prohibition, bringing life back to the ranch and to his father. He falls in love with Isabel Two and they marry and have two children. Tristan becomes involved in small-scale rum-running, finding himself at odds with the O'Banion brothers. Isabel Two is accidentally killed by a police officer working for the O'Banions. In a fit of grief, Tristan beats the officer nearly to death and is jailed. Susannah visits Tristan, still having feelings for him, but he refuses her advances. After his release, Tristan and Decker kill those responsible for Isabel's death, including one of the O'Banion brothers.

Unable to live without Tristan, Susannah commits suicide. The remaining O'Banion brother, along with the sheriff and another police officer, come after Tristan. At the ranch, William and Alfred kill the attackers. Alfred reconciles with his father and brother. The family realizes that Tristan will be blamed for the deaths, which prompts Tristan to ask Alfred to take care of his children. One Stab's narration explains that they buried the bodies and dumped the car in the Missouri River. He reflects that rather than dying young as One Stab expected, Tristan lived to watch his children and grandchildren grow. One Stab observes that it was the people Tristan loved and wanted to protect most that died young.

In 1963, Tristan, now an old man living in the North Country, investigates an animal carcass and is confronted by a grizzly bear. He draws his knife and fights it. As they struggle, One Stab narrates, "It was a good death."

Cast

Production

Filming
Legends of the Fall was primarily filmed on location in Alberta and British Columbia, Canada. Principal photography began in mid-September 1993. The World War I battlefield scenes took two weeks to film and were shot near Morley, Alberta, with hundreds of locals and a few Canadian Forces soldiers recruited as extras. The Ghost River Wilderness Area in Alberta served as the filming location for the Ludlow ranch; additional outdoor scenes, as well as the funeral and cemetery scenes, were shot at the Bow River near Banff National Park. A historic harbour area in Vancouver called Gastown was augmented with period building facades for the Helena, Montana, street scenes. Hotel scenes were shot at the Hotel Europe at 43 Powell Street in Vancouver. Additional scenes were shot at Maple Tree Square in Gastown, Vancouver, and Ocho Rios in Saint Ann, Jamaica. Filming wrapped up around January 1994.

Reception

Box office
The film opened in limited release on December 23, 1994, and expanded to a wide release on January 13, 1995. During its first weekend in wide release, which was a four-day weekend due to Martin Luther King, Jr. Day, the film reached number one at the domestic box office after grossing $14 million. After its initial run, the film brought in a final box office total of $160,638,883. Against its $30 million budget, the film was a financial success.

Critical response
Review aggregator website Rotten Tomatoes reports that 58% of 57 film critics have given the film a positive review, with a rating average of 5.81/10. The site's consensus states: "Featuring a swoon-worthy star turn by Brad Pitt, Legends of the Falls painterly photography and epic sweep often compensate for its lack of narrative momentum and glut of melodramatic twists." Metacritic, which assigns a weighted average score out of 100 to reviews from mainstream critics, gives the film a score of 45 based on 23 reviews, indicating "mixed or average reviews".

Roger Ebert of the Chicago Sun-Times described the film as "pretty good ... with full-blooded performances and heartfelt melodrama". Peter Travers of Rolling Stone particularly praised Pitt's performance saying, "Though the admirable Quinn has the toughest role, Pitt carries the picture. The blue-eyed boy who seemed a bit lost in Interview with the Vampire proves himself a bona fide movie star, stealing every scene he's in." Comparatively, Chris Hicks of Deseret News noted, "Pitt is the hunk of the moment, and Legends of the Fall will only further cement his big-screen, romantic leading-man status. And he is satisfying as the internalized, rebellious Tristan (look for that name to be given to more than a few babies over the next few years). Even if the character seems only a slight twist on the similar role he played in A River Runs Through It. (He even becomes a bootlegger!)"

On the other hand, Rita Kempley of The Washington Post stated that the film's "yarn doesn't so much sweep as sprawl across the screen in all its panoramic idiocy". Janet Maslin of The New York Times commented, "Before it turns exhaustingly hollow, this film shows the potential for bringing Mr. Harrison's tough, brooding tale to life. And the actors may have captured the spirit of the story, but that's impossible to know." She concluded, "These are performances that lost too much in the editing room, smothered by music and overshadowed by a picture-postcard vision of the American West."

Year-end lists 
 Top 10 (listed alphabetically, not ranked) – Bob Ross, The Tampa Tribune
 Top 10 (listed alphabetically, not ranked) – Jeff Simon, The Buffalo News

Accolades

Home media
Legends of the Fall was first released on DVD on April 29, 1997, and once again on October 17, 2000. The film was later released on Blu-ray on February 8, 2011, with bonus content that includes two audio commentaries, deleted scenes with optional commentary and two behind-the-scenes featurettes.

References

External links

 
 
 
 

1994 films
1990s English-language films
1994 romantic drama films
Western Front (World War I) films
American romantic drama films
American Western (genre) epic films
Films about brothers
Films based on American novels
Films based on romance novels
Films directed by Edward Zwick
Films set in Alberta
Films set in Montana
Films set in Vancouver
Films set in 1902
Films set in 1914
Films set in 1919
Films set in 1921
Films set in 1930
Films set in 1963
Films shot in Alberta
Films shot in Vancouver
Films whose cinematographer won the Best Cinematography Academy Award
TriStar Pictures films
Films scored by James Horner
1990s American films